John Thomas "Tom" Lendrum (born December 24, 1927) was a member of the Ohio House of Representatives from 2001–2002.  His district consisted of portions of Lorain County, Ohio. He was succeeded by Kathleen Walcher.

Lendrum has a bachelor's degree in mechanical engineering from Purdue University.

References

Living people
1927 births
Purdue University College of Engineering alumni
Republican Party members of the Ohio House of Representatives
21st-century American politicians